People's Light is a professional, not-for-profit theatre in Chester County, Pennsylvania .

About People's Light 
Founded in 1974, by Dick Keeler, Ken Marini, and Meg and Danny Fruchter, People's Light serves as one of Pennsylvania's largest professional non-profit theatres, known for their resident company of artists, eclectic mix of productions, and innovative work with young people. In each of their 8-9 play seasons, they present a wide range of stories drawn from ancient times through tomorrow that have direct relevance to the local communities and their concerns. In support of this scope, they produce classics and contemporary plays, and commission and produce new work: of their 436 productions, over a third (166) have been world or regional premieres.

The Theatre and Grounds 
Part of this tract of land was occupied by George Washington's troops after the Battle of Brandywine. The barn that houses the Leonard C. Haas Stage of the theatre was renovated in 1978 by Knabb Associates. The residence was built in 1790 and was used as a private boys' school, which was the first school in East Whiteland Township, Pennsylvania. Today it houses The Farmhouse Bistro, a French bistro-style restaurant owned by the theatre, and The Farmhouse at People's Light, an event venue. People's Light is the third owner of the property, following artist Gager Philips, who owned the property in 1936.

The original site of the theatre was Strode's Mill, in East Bradford Township, Pennsylvania.  The mill was built in 1721 and has had a number of uses. Originally used as a grist mill, it is currently being used as an artist's gallery and residence.

Community Programs 

In 1987, People's Light started the "Project Discovery" program, which was later renamed "Arts Discovery." Arts Discovery extends the theatres mission with school residencies, student matinees that bring youth from 21 high schools to People's Light each year for free, and a broad array of theatre classes for grades K through 12.

Community Matters is a series of events that spark dialogue about vital social issues with free staged play readings and town hall-style discussions in partnership with local service organizations.

2018/2019 season 

Such Things as Vampires by Zak Berkman, Stuart Carden, Jessie Fisher, and Mary Tuomanen
Cinderella: A musical Panto by Kathryn Peterson
Sweat by Lynn Nottage
Nina Simon: Four Women by Christina Ham
For Peter Pan on Her 70th Birthday by Sarah Ruhl
Endgame by Samuel Beckett
Mud Row by Dominique Morisseau
Our Town by Thornton Wilder
Little Red Robin Hood :A Musical Panto

References

Further reading 
 

Theatre companies in Pennsylvania
1974 establishments in Pennsylvania